Marco Dodoni (born 5 September 1972) is a former Italian shot putter, five-time national champion at senior level, who competed in four editions of the European Championships.

Personal bests
 Shot put: 19.85 m ( Schio, 17 January 2005)

Achievements

National titles
Dodoni won five national championships at individual senior level.
Italian Athletics Championships
Shot put: 2005, 2013 (2)
Italian Athletics Indoor Championships
Shot put: 2005, 2006, 2013 (3)

References

External links
 

1972 births
Living people
Italian male shot putters
Sportspeople from Verona
Athletics competitors of Gruppo Sportivo Forestale
Italian Athletics Championships winners